Justice Seawell may refer to:

Aaron A. F. Seawell, associate justice of the North Carolina Supreme Court
Emmett Seawell, associate justice of the Supreme Court of California